Gallagher Park may refer to:
Gallagher Park (Edmonton), a large park in Edmonton, Alberta, Canada
Gallagher Park (Omaha), a park in Omaha, Nebraska, United States